Mel Tormé, Rob McConnell and the Boss Brass is a 1986 studio album by Mel Tormé, accompanied by Rob McConnell's Boss Brass Big band. Tormé and McConnell's follow up album, Velvet & Brass was released in 1995.

Track listing 
 "Just Friends" (John Klenner, Sam M. Lewis) - 4:46
 "September Song" (Maxwell Anderson, Kurt Weill) - 4:55
 "Don'cha Go 'Way Mad" (Illinois Jacquet, Jimmy Mundy, Al Stillman) - 4:30
 "A House Is Not a Home" (Burt Bacharach, Hal David) - 3:37
 "The Song Is You" (Oscar Hammerstein II, Jerome Kern) - 3:45
 "Cow Cow Boogie" (Benny Carter, Gene DePaul, Don Raye) - 4:00
 "Handful of Stars"/"Stars Fell on Alabama (Jack Lawrence, Ted Shapiro)/(Frank Perkins, Mitchell Parish) - 5:34
 Duke Ellington Medley: "It Don't Mean a Thing (If It Ain't Got That Swing)"/"Do Nothing Till You Hear from Me"/"Mood Indigo"/"Take the "A" Train"/"Sophisticated Lady"/"Satin Doll" (Duke Ellington, Irving Mills)/(Ellington, Bob Russell)/(Barney Bigard, Ellington, Mills]])/(Ellington, Mills, Mitchell Parish)/(Strayhorn, Ellington, Johnny Mercer) - 12:15

Personnel 
Recorded May 1986, in Los Angeles, U.S.:

 Mel Tormé - vocals
The Boss Brass
 Arnie Chycoski - trumpet, flugelhorn
 Erich Traugott
 John MacLeod
 Ian McDougall - trombone
 Dave McMurdo
 Bob Livingston
 Ron Hughes - bass trombone
 James MacDonald - french horn
 Eugene Amaro - flute, tenor saxophone
 Moe Koffman - clarinet, flute, alto saxophone, soprano saxophone
 Bob Leonard - flute, bass clarinet, baritone saxophone
 Rick Wilkins - clarinet, tenor saxophone
 Dave Woods - trumpet, violin, flugelhorn
 Robert Leonard - flute, bass clarinet, baritone saxophone
 George Stimpson
 Jerry Toth - flute, alto clarinet
 Jimmy Dale - piano, electric piano
 Guido Basso - harmonica, trumpet, flugelhorn
 Ed Bickert - guitar
 Jerry Fuller - drums
 Brian Leonard - percussion
 Steve Wallace - double bass
 Rob McConnell - arranger, conductor, trombone

References 

1986 albums
Concord Records albums
Albums produced by Carl Jefferson
Rob McConnell & The Boss Brass albums
Mel Tormé albums